Four ships of the United States Navy have been named USS Columbus, the first two after the explorer Christopher Columbus, and the other two after Columbus, Ohio, the capital of the state. 

 , a 24-gun armed ship purchased for the Continental Navy in 1775, and active until she was captured and burned in 1778
 , a 74-gun ship of the line commissioned in 1819, and in periodic service until 1861 when she was sunk to prevent capture
 , a heavy cruiser commissioned at the very end of World War II, converted to a guided missile cruiser CG-12 in 1959, and decommissioned in 1975
 , a  attack submarine commissioned in 1993 and in active service

United States Navy ship names